This is a list of notable organizations that promote or practice scientific skepticism.

See also 
 Humanism
 Lists about skepticism
 List of books about skepticism
 List of secularist organizations
 List of skeptical conferences
 List of skeptical magazines
 List of skeptical podcasts
 List of notable skeptics
 Rationalism

References

External links 
 CSI – International Network of Skeptical Organizations
 Somewhere To Think – Introduction portal to several thought-provoking groups around Australia and New Zealand

Lists of organizations
 
Organizations